Bukowiec  is a village in the administrative district of Gmina Mysłakowice, within Jelenia Góra County, Lower Silesian Voivodeship, in south-western Poland.

The village has a population of 710.

The landmarks of Bukowiec are the Gothic Saint Martin church, the Baroque Saint John the Baptist church, and the Neoclassical palace complex with an adjacent park and a observation tower.

During World War II the Germans established and operated a subcamp of the Gross-Rosen concentration camp at the local sanatorium, whose prisoners were Jews.

Notable residents
 Horst Brünner (1929–2008), Deputy Defense Minister in the East German Council of Ministers and chief of the Central Political Administration of the National People's Army

Gallery

References

Villages in Karkonosze County